is a Japanese press manufacturer that manufactures web offset presses, security printing presses, sheet-fed offset presses, package printing presses and printing related equipment.

It is one of the last privately-owned press producers. Komori uses Toyota-based manufacturing principles. Each web press is shown to its customer at the factory in full production. With a close inner circle of developers active in installations and global field service, Komori has used over the years Windows-based systems for press console functions. The mix of their own developments with third party products requires little or no integration process at the installation site.

Their main manufacturing plant is located in Tsukuba in Ibaraki Prefecture.

References

External links

 Komori global website 

Printing press manufacturers
Manufacturing companies based in Tokyo
Companies listed on the Tokyo Stock Exchange
Manufacturing companies established in 1923
Japanese companies established in 1923
Japanese brands